Vasiliy Vasilievich Tishenko (born August 1, 1949) is the mayor of Slobodzya and the head of the Slobodzya district administration in southern Transnistria.

References

Living people
Mayors of places in Moldova
People from Slobozia District
Place of birth missing (living people)
1949 births